The Hôtel de ville is the town hall in the French city of Reims. Previously housing a museum, the city archives, a savings bank, a library, the city police, a tribunal and the chamber of commerce, it now only houses municipal services.

History
Previously meeting at different sites, the town council bought a building on the place du marché-aux-chevaux in 1499. This building soon became too small but a new one could not be built for lack of funds until a 22,000 livre debt was repaid to the city by the duke of Guise. Nicolas Lespagnol, the city inhabitants' lieutenant, laid the foundation stone on 18 June 1627 and the new building was constructed to designed by the architect Jean Bonhomme. Its first wing on rue des Consuls (now called rue du général Sarrail) was completed quickly and the council began meeting there from 1628 onwards. The façade was completed by Nicolas's brother Claude Lespagnol in 1636 and the building as a whole completed with the corner tower in 1823.

Construction resumed in 1863 with the two last wings under the leadership of Narcisse Brunette and his brother Nicolas and they were completed in 1880. It was burned down on 3 March 1917 during the First World War and rebuilt post-war, with work commencing under Bernard Humbold (architecte en chef des monuments historiques) in 1924. The architects Roger-Henri Expert and Paul Bouchette contributed, along with the sculptor Paul Berton, born in Reims; president Gaston Doumergue reopened the building on 10 June 1928.

References

Buildings and structures completed in 1628
Government buildings completed in 1628
Buildings and structures in Reims
City and town halls in France
1628 establishments in France